The Plague of Cyprian was a pandemic that afflicted the Roman Empire from about CE 249 to 262. The plague is thought to have caused widespread manpower shortages for food production and the Roman army, severely weakening the empire during the Crisis of the Third Century. Its modern name commemorates St. Cyprian, bishop of Carthage, an early Christian writer who witnessed and described the plague. The agent of the plague is highly speculative because of sparse sourcing, but suspects have included smallpox, measles, and viral haemorrhagic fever (filoviruses) like the Ebola virus.

Contemporary accounts 
There are no accounts comprehensive enough to estimate the total number of deaths of the plague in the Roman Empire. At the height of the outbreak, 5,000 people a day were said to be dying in Rome. One historian has calculated that the population of Alexandria dropped from 500,000 to 190,000 during the plague. Some of the decline in the city's population was probably due to people fleeing. Pope Dionysus the Great wrote about the plague's effects in Alexandria soon after the Decian persecution of 250 or Valerian persecutions of 257, as reported by Eusebius:

Cyprian's biographer, Pontius of Carthage, wrote of the plague at Carthage:
Afterwards there broke out a dreadful plague, and excessive destruction of a hateful disease invaded every house in succession of the trembling populace, carrying off day by day with abrupt attack numberless people, every one from his own house. All were shuddering, fleeing, shunning the contagion, impiously exposing their own friends, as if with the exclusion of the person who was sure to die of the plague, one could exclude death itself also. There lay about the meanwhile, over the whole city, no longer bodies, but the carcasses of many, and, by the contemplation of a lot which in their turn would be theirs, demanded the pity of the passers-by for themselves. No one regarded anything besides his cruel gains. No one trembled at the remembrance of a similar event. No one did to another what he himself wished to experience.

In Carthage, the Decian persecution, unleashed at the onset of the plague, perhaps inadvertently led to the criminalization of Christians' refusal to take an oath. Fifty years later, a North African convert to Christianity, Arnobius, defended his new religion from pagan allegations:

[...] that a plague was brought upon the earth after the Christian religion came into the world, and after it revealed the mysteries of hidden truth? But pestilences, say my opponents, and droughts, wars, famines, locusts, mice, and hailstones, and other hurtful things, by which the property of men is assailed, the gods bring upon us, incensed as they are by your wrong-doings and by your transgressions.

Cyprian drew moralizing analogies in his sermons to the Christian community and drew a word picture of the plague's symptoms in his essay De mortalitate ("On the Plague"):

This trial, that now the bowels, relaxed into a constant flux, discharge the bodily strength; that a fire originated in the marrow ferments into wounds of the fauces; that the intestines are shaken with a continual vomiting; that the eyes are on fire with the injected blood; that in some cases the feet or some parts of the limbs are taken off by the contagion of diseased putrefaction; that from the weakness arising by the maiming and loss of the body, either the gait is enfeebled, or the hearing is obstructed, or the sight darkened;—is profitable as a proof of faith. What a grandeur of spirit it is to struggle with all the powers of an unshaken mind against so many onsets of devastation and death! what sublimity, to stand erect amid the desolation of the human race, and not to lie prostrate with those who have no hope in God; but rather to rejoice, and to embrace the benefit of the occasion; that in thus bravely showing forth our faith, and by suffering endured, going forward to Christ by the narrow way that Christ trod, we may receive the reward of His life and faith according to His own judgment!

Accounts of the plague date it about AD 249 to 262. There was a later incident in 270 that involved the death of Claudius II Gothicus, but it is unknown if this was the same plague or a different outbreak. According to the Historia Augusta, "in the consulship of Antiochianus and Orfitus the favour of heaven furthered Claudius' success. For a great multitude, the survivors of the barbarian tribes, who had gathered in Haemimontum were so stricken with famine and pestilence that Claudius now scorned to conquer them further... during this same period the Scythians  attempted to plunder in Crete and Cyprus as well, but everywhere their armies were likewise stricken with pestilence and so were defeated".

Contemporary sources indicate that the plague originated in Aethiopia, but treating Aethiopia as the source of contagious diseases goes at least as far back as Thucydides' account of the Plague of Athens. That the plague reached Alexandria at least one year before it reached Rome, however, is a mark in favour of an East African origin.

Epidemiology 
The severe devastation to the European population from the two plagues may indicate that the population had no previous exposure or immunity to the plague's cause. The historian William Hardy McNeill asserts that both the earlier Antonine Plague (166–180) and the Plague of Cyprian (251–270) were the first transfers from animal hosts to humanity of two different diseases, one of smallpox and one of measles, but not necessarily in that order. Dionysios Stathakopoulos asserts that both outbreaks were of smallpox.

According to the historian Kyle Harper, the symptoms attributed by ancient sources to the Plague of Cyprian better match a viral disease causing a hemorrhagic fever, such as Ebola, rather than smallpox. (Conversely, Harper believes that the Antonine Plague was caused by smallpox.)

Legacy 
According to Harper, the plague nearly saw the end of the Roman Empire, and in the period between AD 248 and 268, "the history of Rome is a confusing tangle of violent failures. The structural integrity of the imperial machine burst apart. The frontier system crumbled. The collapse of legitimacy invited one usurper after another to try for the throne. The empire fragmented and only the dramatic success of later emperors in putting the pieces back together prevented this moment from being the final act of Roman imperial history."

Both the threat of imminent death from the plague and the unwavering conviction among many of the Christian clergy in the face of it won many converts to that religion.

See also 
 Disease in Imperial Rome

References

External links 
 Pontius' Life of Cyprian
 Cyprian's De Mortalitate

Pandemics
Crisis of the Third Century
3rd-century disasters
Ancient health disasters
Smallpox epidemics
Influenza pandemics